Bipolar disorder, previously known as manic depression, is a mental disorder characterized by periods of depression and periods of abnormally elevated mood that each last from days to weeks. If the elevated mood is severe or associated with psychosis, it is called mania; if it is less severe, it is called hypomania. During mania, an individual behaves or feels abnormally energetic, happy or irritable, and they often make impulsive decisions with little regard for the consequences. There is usually also a reduced need for sleep during manic phases. During periods of depression, the individual may experience crying and have a negative outlook on life and poor eye contact with others. The risk of suicide is high; over a period of 20 years, 6% of those with bipolar disorder died by suicide, while 30–40% engaged in self-harm. Other mental health issues, such as anxiety disorders and substance use disorders, are commonly associated with bipolar disorder.

While the causes of this mood disorder are not clearly understood, both genetic and environmental factors are thought to play a role. Many genes, each with small effects, may contribute to the development of the disorder. Genetic factors account for about 70–90% of the risk of developing bipolar disorder. Environmental risk factors include a history of childhood abuse and long-term stress. The condition is classified as bipolar I disorder if there has been at least one manic episode, with or without depressive episodes, and as bipolar II disorder if there has been at least one hypomanic episode (but no full manic episodes) and one major depressive episode. It is classified as Cyclothymia if there are hypomanic episodes with periods of depression that do not meet the criteria for major depressive episodes.
If these symptoms are due to drugs or medical problems, they are not diagnosed as bipolar disorder. Other conditions that have overlapping symptoms with bipolar disorder include attention deficit hyperactivity disorder, personality disorders, schizophrenia, and substance use disorder as well as many other medical conditions. Medical testing is not required for a diagnosis, though blood tests or medical imaging can rule out other problems.

Mood stabilizers—lithium and certain anticonvulsants such as valproate and carbamazepine as well as atypical antipsychotics such as aripiprazole—are the mainstay of long-term pharmacologic relapse prevention. Antipsychotics are additionally given during acute manic episodes as well as in cases where mood stabilizers are poorly tolerated or ineffective. In patients where compliance is of concern, long-acting injectable formulations are available. There is some evidence that psychotherapy improves the course of this disorder. The use of antidepressants in depressive episodes is controversial: they can be effective but have been implicated in triggering manic episodes. The treatment of depressive episodes, therefore, is often difficult. Electroconvulsive therapy (ECT) is effective in acute manic and depressive episodes, especially with psychosis or catatonia. Admission to a psychiatric hospital may be required if a person is a risk to themselves or others; involuntary treatment is sometimes necessary if the affected person refuses treatment.

Bipolar disorder occurs in approximately 1% of the global population. In the United States, about 3% are estimated to be affected at some point in their life; rates appear to be similar in females and males. Symptoms most commonly begin between the ages of 20 and 25 years old; an earlier onset in life is associated with a worse prognosis. Interest in functioning in the assessment of patients with bipolar disorder is growing, with an emphasis on specific domains such as work, education, social life, family, and cognition. Around one-quarter to one-third of people with bipolar disorder have financial, social or work-related problems due to the illness. Bipolar disorder is among the top 20 causes of disability worldwide and leads to substantial costs for society. Due to lifestyle choices and the side effects of medications, the risk of death from natural causes such as coronary heart disease in people with bipolar disorder is twice that of the general population.

Signs and symptoms 

Late adolescence and early adulthood are peak years for the onset of bipolar disorder. The condition is characterized by intermittent episodes of mania and/or depression, with an absence of symptoms in between. During these episodes, people with bipolar disorder exhibit disruptions in normal mood, psychomotor activity (the level of physical activity that is influenced by mood)—e.g. constant fidgeting during mania or slowed movements during depression—circadian rhythm and cognition. Mania can present with varying levels of mood disturbance, ranging from euphoria, which is associated with "classic mania", to dysphoria and irritability. Psychotic symptoms such as delusions or hallucinations may occur in both manic and depressive episodes; their content and nature are consistent with the person's prevailing mood.

According to the DSM-5 criteria, mania is distinguished from hypomania by the duration: hypomania is present if elevated mood symptoms persist for at least four consecutive days, while mania is present if such symptoms persist for more than a week. Unlike mania, hypomania is not always associated with impaired functioning. The biological mechanisms responsible for switching from a manic or hypomanic episode to a depressive episode, or vice versa, remain poorly understood.

Manic episodes 

Also known as a manic episode, mania is a distinct period of at least one week of elevated or irritable mood, which can range from euphoria to delirium. The core symptom of mania involves an increase in energy of psychomotor activity. Mania can also present with increased self-esteem or grandiosity, racing thoughts, pressured speech that is difficult to interrupt, decreased need for sleep, disinhibited social behavior, increased goal-oriented activities and impaired judgement, which can lead to exhibition of behaviors characterized as impulsive or high-risk, such as hypersexuality or excessive spending. To fit the definition of a manic episode, these behaviors must impair the individual's ability to socialize or work. If untreated, a manic episode usually lasts three to six months.

In severe manic episodes, a person can experience psychotic symptoms, where thought content is affected along with mood. They may feel unstoppable, or as if they have a special relationship with God, a great mission to accomplish, or other grandiose or delusional ideas. This may lead to violent behavior and, sometimes, hospitalization in an inpatient psychiatric hospital. The severity of manic symptoms can be measured by rating scales such as the Young Mania Rating Scale, though questions remain about the reliability of these scales.

The onset of a manic or depressive episode is often foreshadowed by sleep disturbance. Manic individuals often have a history of substance use disorder developed over years as a form of "self-medication".

Hypomanic episodes 

Hypomania is the milder form of mania, defined as at least four days of the same criteria as mania, but which does not cause a significant decrease in the individual's ability to socialize or work, lacks psychotic features such as delusions or hallucinations, and does not require psychiatric hospitalization. Overall functioning may actually increase during episodes of hypomania and is thought to serve as a defense mechanism against depression by some. Hypomanic episodes rarely progress to full-blown manic episodes. Some people who experience hypomania show increased creativity, while others are irritable or demonstrate poor judgment.

Hypomania may feel good to some individuals who experience it, though most people who experience hypomania state that the stress of the experience is very painful. People with bipolar disorder who experience hypomania tend to forget the effects of their actions on those around them. Even when family and friends recognize mood swings, the individual will often deny that anything is wrong. If not accompanied by depressive episodes, hypomanic episodes are often not deemed problematic unless the mood changes are uncontrollable or volatile. Most commonly, symptoms continue for time periods from a few weeks to a few months.

Depressive episodes 

Symptoms of the depressive phase of bipolar disorder include persistent feelings of sadness, irritability or anger, loss of interest in previously enjoyed activities, excessive or inappropriate guilt, hopelessness, sleeping too much or not enough, changes in appetite and/or weight, fatigue, problems concentrating, self-loathing or feelings of worthlessness, and thoughts of death or suicide. Although the DSM-5 criteria for diagnosing unipolar and bipolar episodes are the same, some clinical features are more common in the latter, including increased sleep, sudden onset and resolution of symptoms, significant weight gain or loss, and severe episodes after childbirth.

The earlier the age of onset, the more likely the first few episodes are to be depressive. For most people with bipolar types 1 and 2, the depressive episodes are much longer than the manic or hypomanic episodes. Since a diagnosis of bipolar disorder requires a manic or hypomanic episode, many affected individuals are initially misdiagnosed as having major depression and incorrectly treated with prescribed antidepressants.

Mixed affective episodes 

In bipolar disorder, a mixed state is an episode during which symptoms of both mania and depression occur simultaneously. Individuals experiencing a mixed state may have manic symptoms such as grandiose thoughts while simultaneously experiencing depressive symptoms such as excessive guilt or feeling suicidal. They are considered to have a higher risk for suicidal behavior as depressive emotions such as hopelessness are often paired with mood swings or difficulties with impulse control. Anxiety disorders occur more frequently as a comorbidity in mixed bipolar episodes than in non-mixed bipolar depression or mania. Substance (including alcohol) use also follows this trend, thereby appearing to depict bipolar symptoms as no more than a consequence of substance use.

Comorbid conditions 
People with bipolar disorder often have other co-existing psychiatric conditions such as anxiety (present in about 71% of people with bipolar disorder), substance abuse (56%), personality disorders (36%) and attention deficit hyperactivity disorder (10–20%) which can add to the burden of illness and worsen the prognosis. Certain medical conditions are also more common in people with bipolar disorder as compared to the general population. This includes increased rates of metabolic syndrome (present in 37% of people with bipolar disorder), migraine headaches (35%), obesity (21%) and type 2 diabetes (14%). This contributes to a risk of death that is two times higher in those with bipolar disorder as compared to the general population.

Substance use disorder is a common comorbidity in bipolar disorder; the subject has been widely reviewed.

Causes 
The causes of bipolar disorder likely vary between individuals and the exact mechanism underlying the disorder remains unclear. Genetic influences are believed to account for 73–93% of the risk of developing the disorder indicating a strong hereditary component. The overall heritability of the bipolar spectrum has been estimated at 0.71. Twin studies have been limited by relatively small sample sizes but have indicated a substantial genetic contribution, as well as environmental influence. For bipolar I disorder, the rate at which identical twins (same genes) will both have bipolar I disorder (concordance) is around 40%, compared to about 5% in fraternal twins. A combination of bipolar I, II, and cyclothymia similarly produced rates of 42% and 11% (identical and fraternal twins, respectively). The rates of bipolar II combinations without bipolar I are lowerbipolar II at 23 and 17%, and bipolar II combining with cyclothymia at 33 and 14%which may reflect relatively higher genetic heterogeneity.

The cause of bipolar disorders overlaps with major depressive disorder. When defining concordance as the co-twins having either bipolar disorder or major depression, then the concordance rate rises to 67% in identical twins and 19% in fraternal twins. The relatively low concordance between fraternal twins brought up together suggests that shared family environmental effects are limited, although the ability to detect them has been limited by small sample sizes.

Genetic 
Behavioral genetic studies have suggested that many chromosomal regions and candidate genes are related to bipolar disorder susceptibility with each gene exerting a mild to moderate effect. The risk of bipolar disorder is nearly ten-fold higher in first-degree relatives of those with bipolar disorder than in the general population; similarly, the risk of major depressive disorder is three times higher in relatives of those with bipolar disorder than in the general population.

Although the first genetic linkage finding for mania was in 1969, linkage studies have been inconsistent. Findings point strongly to heterogeneity, with different genes implicated in different families. Robust and replicable genome-wide significant associations showed several common single-nucleotide polymorphisms (SNPs) are associated with bipolar disorder, including variants within the genes CACNA1C, ODZ4, and NCAN. The largest and most recent genome-wide association study failed to find any locus that exerts a large effect, reinforcing the idea that no single gene is responsible for bipolar disorder in most cases. Polymorphisms in BDNF, DRD4, DAO, and TPH1 have been frequently associated with bipolar disorder and were initially associated in a meta-analysis, but this association disappeared after correction for multiple testing. On the other hand, two polymorphisms in TPH2 were identified as being associated with bipolar disorder.

Due to the inconsistent findings in a genome-wide association study, multiple studies have undertaken the approach of analyzing SNPs in biological pathways. Signaling pathways traditionally associated with bipolar disorder that have been supported by these studies include corticotropin-releasing hormone signaling, cardiac β-adrenergic signaling, Phospholipase C signaling, glutamate receptor signaling, cardiac hypertrophy signaling, Wnt signaling, Notch signaling, and endothelin 1 signaling. Of the 16 genes identified in these pathways, three were found to be dysregulated in the dorsolateral prefrontal cortex portion of the brain in post-mortem studies: CACNA1C, GNG2, and ITPR2.

Bipolar disorder is associated with reduced expression of specific DNA repair enzymes and increased levels of oxidative DNA damages.

Environmental 
Psychosocial factors play a significant role in the development and course of bipolar disorder, and individual psychosocial variables may interact with genetic dispositions. Recent life events and interpersonal relationships likely contribute to the onset  and recurrence of bipolar mood episodes, just as they do for unipolar depression. In surveys, 30–50% of adults diagnosed with bipolar disorder report traumatic/abusive experiences in childhood, which is associated with earlier onset, a higher rate of suicide attempts, and more co-occurring disorders such as post-traumatic stress disorder. The number of reported stressful events in childhood is higher in those with an adult diagnosis of bipolar spectrum disorder than in those without, particularly events stemming from a harsh environment rather than from the child's own behavior. Acutely, mania can be induced by sleep deprivation in around 30% of people with bipolar disorder.

Neurological 
Less commonly, bipolar disorder or a bipolar-like disorder may occur as a result of or in association with a neurological condition or injury including stroke, traumatic brain injury, HIV infection, multiple sclerosis, porphyria, and rarely temporal lobe epilepsy.

Proposed mechanisms

The precise mechanisms that cause bipolar disorder are not well understood. Bipolar disorder is thought to be associated with abnormalities in the structure and function of certain brain areas responsible for cognitive tasks and the processing of emotions. A neurologic model for bipolar disorder proposes that the emotional circuitry of the brain can be divided into two main parts. The ventral system (regulates emotional perception) includes brain structures such as the amygdala, insula, ventral striatum, ventral anterior cingulate cortex, and the prefrontal cortex. The dorsal system (responsible for emotional regulation) includes the hippocampus, dorsal anterior cingulate cortex, and other parts of the prefrontal cortex. The model hypothesizes that bipolar disorder may occur when the ventral system is overactivated and the dorsal system is underactivated. Other models suggest the ability to regulate emotions is disrupted in people with bipolar disorder and that dysfunction of the ventricular prefrontal cortex is crucial to this disruption.

Meta-analyses of structural MRI studies have shown that certain brain regions (e.g., the left rostral anterior cingulate cortex, fronto-insular cortex, ventral prefrontal cortex, and claustrum) are smaller in people with bipolar disorder, whereas other regions are larger (lateral ventricles, globus pallidus, subgenual anterior cingulate, and the amygdala). Additionally, these meta-analyses found that people with bipolar disorder have higher rates of deep white matter hyperintensities.

Functional MRI findings suggest that the ventricular prefrontal cortex regulates the limbic system, especially the amygdala. In people with bipolar disorder, decreased ventricular prefrontal cortex activity allows for the dysregulated activity of the amygdala, which likely contributes to labile mood and poor emotional regulation. Consistent with this, pharmacological treatment of mania returns ventricular prefrontal cortex activity to the levels in non-manic people, suggesting that ventricular prefrontal cortex activity is an indicator of mood state. However, while pharmacological treatment of mania reduces amygdala hyperactivity, it remains more active than the amygdala of those without bipolar disorder, suggesting amygdala activity may be a marker of the disorder rather than the current mood state. Manic and depressive episodes tend to be characterized by dysfunction in different regions of the ventricular prefrontal cortex. Manic episodes appear to be associated with decreased activation of the right ventricular prefrontal cortex whereas depressive episodes are associated with decreased activation of the left ventricular prefrontal cortex. These disruptions often occur during development linked with synaptic pruning dysfunction.

People with bipolar disorder who are in a euthymic mood state show decreased activity in the lingual gyrus compared to people without bipolar disorder. In contrast, they demonstrate decreased activity in the inferior frontal cortex during manic episodes compared to people without the disorder. Similar studies examining the differences in brain activity between people with bipolar disorder and those without did not find a consistent area in the brain that was more or less active when comparing these two groups. People with bipolar have increased activation of left hemisphere ventral limbic areaswhich mediate emotional experiences and generation of emotional responsesand decreased activation of right hemisphere cortical structures related to cognitionstructures associated with the regulation of emotions.

Neuroscientists have proposed additional models to try to explain the cause of bipolar disorder. One proposed model for bipolar disorder suggests that hypersensitivity of reward circuits consisting of frontostriatal circuits causes mania, and decreased sensitivity of these circuits causes depression. According to the "kindling" hypothesis, when people who are genetically predisposed toward bipolar disorder experience stressful events, the stress threshold at which mood changes occur becomes progressively lower, until the episodes eventually start (and recur) spontaneously. There is evidence supporting an association between early-life stress and dysfunction of the hypothalamic-pituitary-adrenal axis leading to its overactivation, which may play a role in the pathogenesis of bipolar disorder. Other brain components that have been proposed to play a role in bipolar disorder are the mitochondria and a sodium ATPase pump. Circadian rhythms and regulation of the hormone melatonin also seem to be altered.

Dopamine, a neurotransmitter responsible for mood cycling, has increased transmission during the manic phase. The dopamine hypothesis states that the increase in dopamine results in secondary homeostatic downregulation of key system elements and receptors such as lower sensitivity of dopaminergic receptors. This results in decreased dopamine transmission characteristic of the depressive phase. The depressive phase ends with homeostatic upregulation potentially restarting the cycle over again. Glutamate is significantly increased within the left dorsolateral prefrontal cortex during the manic phase of bipolar disorder, and returns to normal levels once the phase is over.

Medications used to treat bipolar may exert their effect by modulating intracellular signaling, such as through depleting myo-inositol levels, inhibition of cAMP signaling, and through altering subunits of the dopamine-associated G-protein. Consistent with this, elevated levels of Gαi, Gαs, and Gαq/11 have been reported in brain and blood samples, along with increased protein kinase A (PKA) expression and sensitivity; typically, PKA activates as part of the intracellular signalling cascade downstream from the detachment of Gαs subunit from the G protein complex.

Decreased levels of 5-hydroxyindoleacetic acid, a byproduct of serotonin, are present in the cerebrospinal fluid of persons with bipolar disorder during both the depressed and manic phases. Increased dopaminergic activity has been hypothesized in manic states due to the ability of dopamine agonists to stimulate mania in people with bipolar disorder. Decreased sensitivity of regulatory α2 adrenergic receptors as well as increased cell counts in the locus coeruleus indicated increased noradrenergic activity in manic people. Low plasma GABA levels on both sides of the mood spectrum have been found. One review found no difference in monoamine levels, but found abnormal norepinephrine turnover in people with bipolar disorder. Tyrosine depletion was found to reduce the effects of methamphetamine in people with bipolar disorder as well as symptoms of mania, implicating dopamine in mania. VMAT2 binding was found to be increased in one study of people with bipolar mania.

Diagnosis 
Bipolar disorder is commonly diagnosed during adolescence or early adulthood, but onset can occur throughout life. Its diagnosis is based on the self-reported experiences of the individual, abnormal behavior reported by family members, friends or co-workers, observable signs of illness as assessed by a clinician, and ideally a medical work-up to rule out other causes. Caregiver-scored rating scales, specifically from the mother, have shown to be more accurate than teacher and youth-scored reports in identifying youths with bipolar disorder. Assessment is usually done on an outpatient basis; admission to an inpatient facility is considered if there is a risk to oneself or others.

The most widely used criteria for diagnosing bipolar disorder are from the American Psychiatric Association's (APA) Diagnostic and Statistical Manual of Mental Disorders, Fifth Edition (DSM-5) and the World Health Organization's (WHO) International Statistical Classification of Diseases and Related Health Problems, 10th Edition (ICD-10). The ICD-10 criteria are used more often in clinical settings outside of the U.S. while the DSM criteria are used within the U.S. and are the prevailing criteria used internationally in research studies. The DSM-5, published in 2013, includes further and more accurate specifiers compared to its predecessor, the DSM-IV-TR. This work has influenced the upcoming eleventh revision of the ICD, which includes the various diagnoses within the bipolar spectrum of the DSM-V.

Several rating scales for the screening and evaluation of bipolar disorder exist, including the Bipolar spectrum diagnostic scale, Mood Disorder Questionnaire, the General Behavior Inventory and the Hypomania Checklist. The use of evaluation scales cannot substitute a full clinical interview but they serve to systematize the recollection of symptoms. On the other hand, instruments for screening bipolar disorder tend to have lower sensitivity.

Differential diagnosis 
Bipolar disorder is classified by the International Classification of Diseases as a mental and behavioural disorder. Mental disorders that can have symptoms similar to those seen in bipolar disorder include schizophrenia, major depressive disorder, attention deficit hyperactivity disorder (ADHD), and certain personality disorders, such as borderline personality disorder. A key difference between bipolar disorder and borderline personality disorder is the nature of the mood swings; in contrast to the sustained changes to mood over days to weeks or longer, those of the latter condition (more accurately called emotional dysregulation) are sudden and often short-lived, and secondary to social stressors.

Although there are no biological tests that are diagnostic of bipolar disorder, blood tests and/or imaging are carried out to investigate whether medical illnesses with clinical presentations similar to that of bipolar disorder are present before making a definitive diagnosis. Neurologic diseases such as multiple sclerosis, complex partial seizures, strokes, brain tumors, Wilson's disease, traumatic brain injury, Huntington's disease, and complex migraines can mimic features of bipolar disorder. An EEG may be used to exclude neurological disorders such as epilepsy, and a CT scan or MRI of the head may be used to exclude brain lesions. Additionally, disorders of the endocrine system such as hypothyroidism, hyperthyroidism, and Cushing's disease are in the differential as is the connective tissue disease systemic lupus erythematosus. Infectious causes of mania that may appear similar to bipolar mania include herpes encephalitis, HIV, influenza, or neurosyphilis. Certain vitamin deficiencies such as pellagra (niacin deficiency), Vitamin B12 deficiency, folate deficiency, and Wernicke Korsakoff syndrome (thiamine deficiency) can also lead to mania. Common medications that can cause manic symptoms include antidepressants, prednisone, Parkinson's disease medications, thyroid hormone, stimulants (including cocaine and methamphetamine), and certain antibiotics.

Bipolar spectrum 

Bipolar spectrum disorders include: bipolar I disorder, bipolar II disorder, cyclothymic disorder and cases where subthreshold symptoms are found to cause clinically significant impairment or distress. These disorders involve major depressive episodes that alternate with manic or hypomanic episodes, or with mixed episodes that feature symptoms of both mood states. The concept of the bipolar spectrum is similar to that of Emil Kraepelin's original concept of manic depressive illness. Bipolar II disorder was established as a diagnosis in 1994 within DSM IV; though debate continues over whether it is a distinct entity, part of a spectrum, or exists at all.

Criteria and subtypes 

The DSM and the ICD characterize bipolar disorder as a spectrum of disorders occurring on a continuum. The DSM-5 and ICD-11 lists three specific subtypes:

 Bipolar I disorder: At least one manic episode is necessary to make the diagnosis; depressive episodes are common in the vast majority of cases with bipolar disorder I, but are unnecessary for the diagnosis. Specifiers such as "mild, moderate, moderate-severe, severe" and "with psychotic features" should be added as applicable to indicate the presentation and course of the disorder.
 Bipolar II disorder: No manic episodes and one or more hypomanic episodes and one or more major depressive episodes. Hypomanic episodes do not go to the full extremes of mania (i.e., do not usually cause severe social or occupational impairment, and are without psychosis), and this can make bipolar II more difficult to diagnose, since the hypomanic episodes may simply appear as periods of successful high productivity and are reported less frequently than a distressing, crippling depression.
 Cyclothymia: A history of hypomanic episodes with periods of depression that do not meet criteria for major depressive episodes.

When relevant, specifiers for peripartum onset and with rapid cycling should be used with any subtype. Individuals who have subthreshold symptoms that cause clinically significant distress or impairment, but do not meet full criteria for one of the three subtypes may be diagnosed with other specified or unspecified bipolar disorder. Other specified bipolar disorder is used when a clinician chooses to explain why the full criteria were not met (e.g., hypomania without a prior major depressive episode). If the condition is thought to have a non-psychiatric medical cause, the diagnosis of bipolar and related disorder due to another medical condition is made, while substance/medication-induced bipolar and related disorder is used if a medication is thought to have triggered the condition.

Rapid cycling 
Most people who meet criteria for bipolar disorder experience a number of episodes, on average 0.4 to 0.7 per year, lasting three to six months. Rapid cycling, however, is a course specifier that may be applied to any bipolar subtype. It is defined as having four or more mood disturbance episodes within a one-year span. Rapid cycling is usually temporary but is common amongst people with bipolar disorder and affects between 25.8 and 45.3% of them at some point in their life. These episodes are separated from each other by a remission (partial or full) for at least two months or a switch in mood polarity (i.e., from a depressive episode to a manic episode or vice versa). The definition of rapid cycling most frequently cited in the literature (including the DSM-V and ICD-11) is that of Dunner and Fieve: at least four major depressive, manic, hypomanic or mixed episodes during a 12-month period. The literature examining the pharmacological treatment of rapid cycling is sparse and there is no clear consensus with respect to its optimal pharmacological management. People with the rapid cycling or ultradian subtypes of bipolar disorder tend to be more difficult to treat and less responsive to medications than other people with bipolar disorder.

Coexisting psychiatric conditions 
The diagnosis of bipolar disorder can be complicated by coexisting (comorbid) psychiatric conditions including obsessive–compulsive disorder, substance-use disorder, eating disorders, attention deficit hyperactivity disorder, social phobia, premenstrual syndrome (including premenstrual dysphoric disorder), or panic disorder. A thorough longitudinal analysis of symptoms and episodes, assisted if possible by discussions with friends and family members, is crucial to establishing a treatment plan where these comorbidities exist. Children of parents with bipolar disorder more frequently have other mental health problems.

Children 

In the 1920s, Kraepelin noted that manic episodes are rare before puberty. In general, bipolar disorder in children was not recognized in the first half of the twentieth century. This issue diminished with an increased following of the DSM criteria in the last part of the twentieth century. The diagnosis of childhood bipolar disorder, while formerly controversial, has gained greater acceptance among childhood and adolescent psychiatrists. American children and adolescents diagnosed with bipolar disorder in community hospitals increased 4-fold reaching rates of up to 40% in 10 years around the beginning of the 21st century, while in outpatient clinics it doubled reaching 6%. Studies using DSM criteria show that up to 1% of youth may have bipolar disorder. The DSM-5 has established a diagnosis—disruptive mood dysregulation disorder—that covers children with long-term, persistent irritability that had at times been misdiagnosed as having bipolar disorder, distinct from irritability in bipolar disorder that is restricted to discrete mood episodes.

Elderly 
Bipolar disorder is uncommon in older patients, with a measured lifetime prevalence of 1% in over 60s and a 12-month prevalence of 0.10.5% in people over 65. Despite this, it is overrepresented in psychiatric admissions, making up 48% of inpatient admission to aged care psychiatry units, and the incidence of mood disorders is increasing overall with the aging population. Depressive episodes more commonly present with sleep disturbance, fatigue, hopelessness about the future, slowed thinking, and poor concentration and memory; the last three symptoms are seen in what is known as pseudodementia. Clinical features also differ between those with late-onset bipolar disorder and those who developed it early in life; the former group present with milder manic episodes, more prominent cognitive changes and have a background of worse psychosocial functioning, while the latter present more commonly with mixed affective episodes, and have a stronger family history of illness. Older people with bipolar disorder experience cognitive changes, particularly in executive functions such as abstract thinking and switching cognitive sets, as well as concentrating for long periods and decision-making.

Prevention 
Attempts at prevention of bipolar disorder have focused on stress (such as childhood adversity or highly conflictual families) which, although not a diagnostically specific causal agent for bipolar, does place genetically and biologically vulnerable individuals at risk for a more severe course of illness. Longitudinal studies have indicated that full-blown manic stages are often preceded by a variety of prodromal clinical features, providing support for the occurrence of an at-risk state of the disorder when an early intervention might prevent its further development and/or improve its outcome.

Management 

The aim of management is to treat acute episodes safely with medication and work with the patient in long-term maintenance to prevent further episodes and optimise function using a combination of  pharmacological and psychotherapeutic techniques. Hospitalization may be required especially with the manic episodes present in bipolar I. This can be voluntary or (local legislation permitting) involuntary. Long-term inpatient stays are now less common due to deinstitutionalization, although these can still occur. Following (or in lieu of) a hospital admission, support services available can include drop-in centers, visits from members of a community mental health team or an Assertive Community Treatment team, supported employment, patient-led support groups, and intensive outpatient programs. These are sometimes referred to as partial-inpatient programs.

Psychosocial 
Psychotherapy aims to assist a person with bipolar disorder in accepting and understanding their diagnosis, coping with various types of stress, improving their interpersonal relationships, and recognizing prodromal symptoms before full-blown recurrence. Cognitive behavioral therapy (CBT), family-focused therapy, and psychoeducation have the most evidence for efficacy in regard to relapse prevention, while interpersonal and social rhythm therapy and cognitive-behavioral therapy appear the most effective in regard to residual depressive symptoms. Most studies have been based only on bipolar I, however, and treatment during the acute phase can be a particular challenge. Some clinicians emphasize the need to talk with individuals experiencing mania, to develop a therapeutic alliance in support of recovery.

Medication 

Medications are often prescribed to help improve symptoms of bipolar disorder. Medications approved for treating bipolar disorder including mood stabilizers, antipsychotics, and antidepressants. Sometimes a combination of medications may also be suggested. The choice of medications may differ depending on the bipolar disorder episode type or if the person is experiencing unipolar or bipolar depression. Other factors to consider when deciding on an appropriate treatment approach includes if the person has any comorbidities, their response to previous therapies, adverse effects, and the desire of the person to be treated.

Mood stabilizers
Lithium and the anticonvulsants carbamazepine, lamotrigine, and valproic acid are classed as mood stabilizers due to their effect on the mood states in bipolar disorder. Lithium has the best overall evidence and is considered an effective treatment for acute manic episodes, preventing relapses, and bipolar depression. Lithium reduces the risk of suicide, self-harm, and death in people with bipolar disorder. Lithium is preferred for long-term mood stabilization. Lithium treatment is also associated with adverse effects and it has been shown to erode kidney and thyroid function over extended periods. Valproate has become a commonly prescribed treatment and effectively treats manic episodes. Carbamazepine is less effective in preventing relapse than lithium or valproate. Lamotrigine has some efficacy in treating depression, and this benefit is greatest in more severe depression. It has also been shown to have some benefit in preventing bipolar disorder relapses, though there are concerns about the studies done, and is of no benefit in rapid cycling subtype of bipolar disorder. Valproate and carbamazepine are teratogenic and should be avoided as a treatment in women of childbearing age, but discontinuation of these medications during pregnancy is associated with a high risk of relapse. The effectiveness of topiramate is unknown. Carbamazepine effectively treats manic episodes, with some evidence it has greater benefit in rapid-cycling bipolar disorder, or those with more psychotic symptoms or more symptoms similar to that of schizoaffective disorder.

Mood stabilizers are used for long-term maintenance but have not demonstrated the ability to quickly treat acute bipolar depression.

Antipsychotics
Antipsychotic medications are effective for short-term treatment of bipolar manic episodes and appear to be superior to lithium and anticonvulsants for this purpose. Atypical antipsychotics are also indicated for bipolar depression refractory to treatment with mood stabilizers. Olanzapine is effective in preventing relapses, although the supporting evidence is weaker than the evidence for lithium. A 2006 review found that haloperidol was an effective treatment for acute mania, limited data supported no difference in overall efficacy between haloperidol, olanzapine or risperidone, and that it could be less effective than aripiprazole.

Antidepressants
Antidepressants are not recommended for use alone in the treatment of bipolar disorder and do not provide any benefit over mood stabilizers. Atypical antipsychotic medications (e.g., aripiprazole) are preferred over antidepressants to augment the effects of mood stabilizers due to the lack of efficacy of antidepressants in bipolar disorder. Treatment of bipolar disorder using antidepressants carries a risk of affective switches; where a person switches from depression to manic or hypomanic phases. The risk of affective switches is higher in bipolar I depression; antidepressants are generally avoided in bipolar I disorder or only used with mood stabilizers when they are deemed necessary. There is also a risk of accelerating cycling between phases when antidepressants are used in bipolar disorder.

Combined treatment approaches 
Antipsychotics and mood stabilizers used together are quicker and more effective at treating mania than either class of drug used alone. Some analyses indicate antipsychotics alone are also more effective at treating acute mania.  A first-line treatment for depression in bipolar disorder is a combination of olanzapine and fluoxetine.

Other drugs
Short courses of benzodiazepines are used in addition to other medications for calming effect until mood stabilizing become effective. Electroconvulsive therapy (ECT) is an effective form of treatment for acute mood disturbances in those with bipolar disorder, especially when psychotic or catatonic features are displayed. ECT is also recommended for use in pregnant women with bipolar disorder. It is unclear if ketamine (a common general dissociative anesthetic used in surgery) is useful in bipolar disorder. Gabapentin and pregabalin are not proven to be effective for treating bipolar disorder.

Children
Treating bipolar disorder in children involves medication and psychotherapy. The literature and research on the effects of psychosocial therapy on bipolar spectrum disorders are scarce, making it difficult to determine the efficacy of various therapies. Mood stabilizers and atypical antipsychotics are commonly prescribed. Among the former, lithium is the only compound approved by the FDA for children. Psychological treatment combines normally education on the disease, group therapy, and cognitive behavioral therapy. Long-term medication is often needed.

Resistance to treatment 
The occurrence of poor response to treatment in has given support to the concept of resistance to treatment in bipolar disorder. Guidelines to the definition of such treatment resistance and evidence-based options for its management were reviewed in 2020.

Prognosis 
A lifelong condition with periods of partial or full recovery in between recurrent episodes of relapse, bipolar disorder is considered to be a major health problem worldwide because of the increased rates of disability and premature mortality. It is also associated with co-occurring psychiatric and medical problems, higher rates of death from natural causes (e.g., cardiovascular disease), and high rates of initial under- or misdiagnosis, causing a delay in appropriate treatment and contributing to poorer prognoses. When compared to the general population, people with bipolar disorder also have higher rates of other serious medical comorbidities including diabetes mellitus, respiratory diseases, HIV, and Hepatitis C virus infection. After a diagnosis is made, it remains difficult to achieve complete remission of all symptoms with the currently available psychiatric medications and symptoms often become progressively more severe over time.

Compliance with medications is one of the most significant factors that can decrease the rate and severity of relapse and have a positive impact on overall prognosis. However, the types of medications used in treating BD commonly cause side effects and more than 75% of individuals with BD inconsistently take their medications for various reasons. Of the various types of the disorder, rapid cycling (four or more episodes in one year) is associated with the worst prognosis due to higher rates of self-harm and suicide. Individuals diagnosed with bipolar who have a family history of bipolar disorder are at a greater risk for more frequent manic/hypomanic episodes. Early onset and psychotic features are also associated with worse outcomes, as well as subtypes that are nonresponsive to lithium.

Early recognition and intervention also improve prognosis as the symptoms in earlier stages are less severe and more responsive to treatment. Onset after adolescence is connected to better prognoses for both genders, and being male is a protective factor against higher levels of depression. For women, better social functioning before developing bipolar disorder and being a parent are protective towards suicide attempts.

Functioning 
Changes in cognitive processes and abilities are seen in mood disorders, with those of bipolar disorder being greater than those in major depressive disorder. These include reduced attentional and executive capabilities and impaired memory. People with bipolar disorder often experience a decline in cognitive functioning during (or possibly before) their first episode, after which a certain degree of cognitive dysfunction typically becomes permanent, with more severe impairment during acute phases and moderate impairment during periods of remission. As a result, two-thirds of people with BD continue to experience impaired psychosocial functioning in between episodes even when their mood symptoms are in full remission. A similar pattern is seen in both BD-I and BD-II, but people with BD-II experience a lesser degree of impairment.

When bipolar disorder occurs in children, it severely and adversely affects their psychosocial development. Children and adolescents with bipolar disorder have higher rates of significant difficulties with substance use disorders, psychosis, academic difficulties, behavioral problems, social difficulties, and legal problems.  Cognitive deficits typically increase over the course of the illness. Higher degrees of impairment correlate with the number of previous manic episodes and hospitalizations, and with the presence of psychotic symptoms. Early intervention can slow the progression of cognitive impairment, while treatment at later stages can help reduce distress and negative consequences related to cognitive dysfunction.

Despite the overly ambitious goals that are frequently part of manic episodes, symptoms of mania undermine the ability to achieve these goals and often interfere with an individual's social and occupational functioning. One-third of people with BD remain unemployed for one year following a hospitalization for mania. Depressive symptoms during and between episodes, which occur much more frequently for most people than hypomanic or manic symptoms over the course of illness, are associated with lower functional recovery in between episodes, including unemployment or underemployment for both BD-I and BD-II. However, the course of illness (duration, age of onset, number of hospitalizations, and the presence or not of rapid cycling) and cognitive performance are the best predictors of employment outcomes in individuals with bipolar disorder, followed by symptoms of depression and years of education.

Recovery and recurrence 
A naturalistic study in 2003 by Tohen and coworkers from the first admission for mania or mixed episode (representing the hospitalized and therefore most severe cases) found that 50% achieved syndromal recovery (no longer meeting criteria for the diagnosis) within six weeks and 98% within two years. Within two years, 72% achieved symptomatic recovery (no symptoms at all) and 43% achieved functional recovery (regaining of prior occupational and residential status). However, 40% went on to experience a new episode of mania or depression within 2 years of syndromal recovery, and 19% switched phases without recovery.

Symptoms preceding a relapse (prodromal), especially those related to mania, can be reliably identified by people with bipolar disorder. There have been intents to teach patients coping strategies when noticing such symptoms with encouraging results.

Suicide 
Bipolar disorder can cause suicidal ideation that leads to suicide attempts. Individuals whose bipolar disorder begins with a depressive or mixed affective episode seem to have a poorer prognosis and an increased risk of suicide. One out of two people with bipolar disorder attempt suicide at least once during their lifetime and many attempts are successfully completed. The annual average suicide rate is 0.4%, which is 10–20 times that of the general population. The number of deaths from suicide in bipolar disorder is between 18 and 25 times higher than would be expected in similarly aged people without bipolar disorder. The lifetime risk of suicide has been estimated to be as high as 20% in those with bipolar disorder.

Risk factors for suicide attempts and death from suicide in people with bipolar disorder include older age, prior suicide attempts, a depressive or mixed index episode (first episode), a manic index episode with psychotic symptoms, hopelessness or psychomotor agitation present during the episodes, co-existing anxiety disorder, a first degree relative with a mood disorder or suicide, interpersonal conflicts, occupational problems, bereavement or social isolation.

Epidemiology 

Bipolar disorder is the sixth leading cause of disability worldwide and has a lifetime prevalence of about 1 to 3% in the general population. However, a reanalysis of data from the National Epidemiological Catchment Area survey in the United States suggested that 0.8% of the population experience a manic episode at least once (the diagnostic threshold for bipolar I) and a further 0.5% have a hypomanic episode (the diagnostic threshold for bipolar II or cyclothymia). Including sub-threshold diagnostic criteria, such as one or two symptoms over a short time-period, an additional 5.1% of the population, adding up to a total of 6.4%, were classified as having a bipolar spectrum disorder. A more recent analysis of data from a second US National Comorbidity Survey found that 1% met lifetime prevalence criteria for bipolar I, 1.1% for bipolar II, and 2.4% for subthreshold symptoms. Estimates vary about how many children and young adults have bipolar disorder. These estimates range from 0.6 to 15% depending on differing settings, methods, and referral settings, raising suspicions of overdiagnosis. One meta-analysis of bipolar disorder in young people worldwide estimated that about 1.8% of people between the ages of seven and 21 have bipolar disorder. Similar to adults, bipolar disorder in children and adolescents is thought to occur at a similar frequency in boys and girls.

There are conceptual and methodological limitations and variations in the findings. Prevalence studies of bipolar disorder are typically carried out by lay interviewers who follow fully structured/fixed interview schemes; responses to single items from such interviews may have limited validity. In addition, diagnoses (and therefore estimates of prevalence) vary depending on whether a categorical or spectrum approach is used. This consideration has led to concerns about the potential for both underdiagnosis and overdiagnosis.

The incidence of bipolar disorder is similar in men and women as well as across different cultures and ethnic groups. A 2000 study by the World Health Organization found that prevalence and incidence of bipolar disorder are very similar across the world. Age-standardized prevalence per 100,000 ranged from 421.0 in South Asia to 481.7 in Africa and Europe for men and from 450.3 in Africa and Europe to 491.6 in Oceania for women. However, severity may differ widely across the globe. Disability-adjusted life year rates, for example, appear to be higher in developing countries, where medical coverage may be poorer and medication less available. Within the United States, Asian Americans have significantly lower rates than their African American and European American counterparts. In 2017, the Global Burden of Disease Study estimated there were 4.5 million new cases and a total of 45.5 million cases globally.

History 

In the early 1800s, French psychiatrist Jean-Étienne Dominique Esquirol's lypemania, one of his affective monomanias, was the first elaboration on what was to become modern depression. The basis of the current conceptualization of bipolar illness can be traced back to the 1850s. In 1850, Jean-Pierre Falret described "circular insanity" (la folie circulaire); the lecture was summarized in 1851 in the "Gazette des hôpitaux" ("Hospital Gazette"). Three years later, in 1854, Jules-Gabriel-François Baillarger (1809–1890) described to the French Imperial Académie Nationale de Médecine a biphasic mental illness causing recurrent oscillations between mania and melancholia, which he termed folie à double forme ("madness in double form"). Baillarger's original paper, "De la folie à double forme," appeared in the medical journal Annales médico-psychologiques (Medico-psychological annals) in 1854.

These concepts were developed by the German psychiatrist Emil Kraepelin (1856–1926), who, using Kahlbaum's concept of cyclothymia, categorized and studied the natural course of untreated bipolar patients. He coined the term manic depressive psychosis, after noting that periods of acute illness, manic or depressive, were generally punctuated by relatively symptom-free intervals where the patient was able to function normally.

The term "manic–depressive reaction" appeared in the first version of the DSM in 1952, influenced by the legacy of Adolf Meyer. Subtyping into "unipolar" depressive disorders and bipolar disorders has its origin in Karl Kleist's concept – since 1911 – of unipolar and bipolar affective disorders, which was used by Karl Leonhard in 1957 to differentiate between unipolar and bipolar disorder in depression. These subtypes have been regarded as separate conditions since publication of the DSM-III. The subtypes bipolar II and rapid cycling have been included since the DSM-IV, based on work from the 1970s by David Dunner, Elliot Gershon, Frederick Goodwin, Ronald Fieve, and Joseph Fleiss.

Society and culture

Cost
The United States spent approximately $202.1 billion on people diagnosed with bipolar I disorder (excluding other subtypes of bipolar disorder and undiagnosed people) in 2015. One analysis estimated that the United Kingdom spent approximately £5.2 billion on the disorder in 2007. In addition to the economic costs, bipolar disorder is a leading cause of disability and lost productivity worldwide. People with bipolar disorder are generally more disabled, have a lower level of functioning, longer duration of illness, and increased rates of work absenteeism and decreased productivity when compared to people experiencing other mental health disorders. The decrease in the productivity seen in those who care for people with bipolar disorder also significantly contributes to these costs.

Advocacy
There are widespread issues with social stigma, stereotypes, and prejudice against individuals with a diagnosis of bipolar disorder. In 2000, actress Carrie Fisher went public with her bipolar disorder diagnosis. She became one of the most well-recognized advocates for people with bipolar disorder in the public eye and fiercely advocated to eliminate the stigma surrounding mental illnesses, including bipolar disorder. Stephen Fried, who has written extensively on the topic, noted that Fisher helped to draw attention to the disorder's chronicity, relapsing nature, and that bipolar disorder relapses do not indicate a lack of discipline or moral shortcomings. Since being diagnosed at age 37, actor Stephen Fry has pushed to raise awareness of the condition, with his 2006 documentary Stephen Fry: The Secret Life of the Manic Depressive. In an effort to ease the social stigma associated with bipolar disorder, the orchestra conductor Ronald Braunstein cofounded the ME/2 Orchestra with his wife Caroline Whiddon in 2011. Braunstein was diagnosed with bipolar disorder in 1985 and his concerts with the ME/2 Orchestra were conceived in order to create a welcoming performance environment for his musical colleagues, while also raising public awareness about mental illness.

Notable cases
Numerous authors have written about bipolar disorder and many successful people have openly discussed their experience with it. Kay Redfield Jamison, a clinical psychologist and professor of psychiatry at the Johns Hopkins University School of Medicine, profiled her own bipolar disorder in her memoir An Unquiet Mind (1995). Several celebrities have also publicly shared that they have bipolar disorder; in addition to Carrie Fisher and Stephen Fry these include Catherine Zeta-Jones, Mariah Carey, Kanye West, Jane Pauley, Demi Lovato, Selena Gomez, and Russell Brand.

Media portrayals
Several dramatic works have portrayed characters with traits suggestive of the diagnosis which have been the subject of discussion by psychiatrists and film experts alike.

In Mr. Jones (1993), (Richard Gere) swings from a manic episode into a depressive phase and back again, spending time in a psychiatric hospital and displaying many of the features of the syndrome. In The Mosquito Coast (1986), Allie Fox (Harrison Ford) displays some features including recklessness, grandiosity, increased goal-directed activity and mood lability, as well as some paranoia. Psychiatrists have suggested that Willy Loman, the main character in Arthur Miller's classic play Death of a Salesman, has bipolar disorder.

The 2009 drama 90210 featured a character, Silver, who was diagnosed with bipolar disorder. Stacey Slater, a character from the BBC soap EastEnders, has been diagnosed with the disorder. The storyline was developed as part of the BBC's Headroom campaign. The Channel 4 soap Brookside had earlier featured a story about bipolar disorder when the character Jimmy Corkhill was diagnosed with the condition. 2011 Showtime's political thriller drama Homeland protagonist Carrie Mathison has bipolar disorder, which she has kept secret since her school days. The 2014 ABC medical drama, Black Box, featured a world-renowned neuroscientist with bipolar disorder.
In the TV series Dave, the eponymous main character, played by Lil Dicky as a fictionalized version of himself, is an aspiring rapper. Lil Dicky's real-life hype man GaTa also plays himself. In one episode, after being off his medication and having an episode, GaTa tearfully confesses to having bipolar disorder. GaTa has bipolar disorder in real life but, like his character in the show, he is able to manage it with medication.

Creativity

A link between mental illness and professional success or creativity has been suggested, including in accounts by Socrates, Seneca the Younger, and Cesare Lombroso. Despite prominence in popular culture, the link between creativity and bipolar has not been rigorously studied. This area of study also is likely affected by confirmation bias. Some evidence suggests that some heritable component of bipolar disorder overlaps with heritable components of creativity. Probands of people with bipolar disorder are more likely to be professionally successful, as well as to demonstrate temperamental traits similar to bipolar disorder. Furthermore, while studies of the frequency of bipolar disorder in creative population samples have been conflicting, full-blown bipolar disorder in creative samples is rare.

Research
Research directions for bipolar disorder in children include optimizing treatments, increasing the knowledge of the genetic and neurobiological basis of the pediatric disorder and improving diagnostic criteria. Some treatment research suggests that psychosocial interventions that involve the family, psychoeducation, and skills building (through therapies such as CBT, DBT, and IPSRT) can benefit in addition to pharmacotherapy.

See also 

 List of people with bipolar disorder
 Outline of bipolar disorder
 Bipolar I disorder
 Bipolar II disorder
 Bipolar NOS
 Cyclothymia
 Bipolar disorders research
 Borderline personality disorder
 Emotional dysregulation
 Mood (psychology)
 Mood swing
 Ultradian bipolar disorder
 International Society for Bipolar Disorders

Explanatory notes

Citations

Cited texts

Further reading

External links 

 
Depression (mood)
Mood disorders
Wikipedia neurology articles ready to translate
Wikipedia medicine articles ready to translate